Robert Pierrepont is the name of:
 Robert Pierrepont, 1st Earl of Kingston-upon-Hull (1584–1643), English nobleman
Robert Pierrepont (MP) (c 1638–1681), Member of Parliament for Nottingham
 Robert Pierrepont, 3rd Earl of Kingston-upon-Hull (1660–1682), English peer

See also
Robert Pierpoint (disambiguation)